Edmund Quincy may refer to:

Edmund Quincy (1602–1636), settled Mount Wollaston area of Quincy, Massachusetts around 1628
Edmund Quincy (1628–1698), colonist, Massachusetts representative, son of Edmund (1602–1636)
Edmund Quincy (1681–1737), colonist, Massachusetts Supreme Court judge, son of Edmund (1627–1698)
Edmund Quincy (1703–1788), son of Edmund (1681–1737)
Edmund Quincy (1726–1782), businessman and land developer, son of Edmund (1703–1788)
Edmund Quincy (1808–1877), diarist, lecturer, author, abolitionist, son of Josiah Quincy III

See also
Quincy political family, a prominent political family